Abdelkarim Jouaiti (Arabic: عبد الكريم جويطي) (born 1962) is a Moroccan novelist.

Early life
Born in Beni Mellal, he works in the Moroccan civil service and was at one point the Ministry of Culture's regional director in Tadla-Azilal.

Career
He is the author of several novels including: 
 Night of the Sun (1992)
 Celebrations of Death (1996)
 Yellow Morella (2002)
 Platoon of Ruin (2007)
 
Platoon of Ruin was longlisted for the Arabic Booker Prize in 2009.

External links
 Author's website (in Arabic)

References

People from Beni Mellal
Moroccan novelists
Moroccan male writers
Male novelists
1962 births
Living people